Zvishavane, originally known as Shabani, is a mining town in Midlands Province, Zimbabwe. It is also on direct rail links to Gweru and Beit Bridge which then link up with Harare and Bulawayo in Zimbabwe and to Maputo in Mozambique, and Pretoria in South Africa. It has a private airport serving the city.

Name
Zvishavane was formerly called Shabanie (used by the mine) or Shabani (used for the town). The name "Shabanie" has been said to be derived from "shavani", a Ndebele word meaning "finger millet", or "trading together".

Zvishavane is a Shona name, which is said to be derived from "zvikomo zvishava", which means "red hills". The name means "reddish or 'reddened' hills", referring to the many surrounding low hills that are characterised by red soil.

Zvishavane derives its name from its sister town Mashava. Mashava is a ChiShona word describing the hills in that place as reddish. The name Mashava formerly Mashaba origins is stated in the Rhodesian Lore and Legend: SOUTHERN RHODESIA PLACE NAMES published by The Chief Information Officer, 
Information Services
Branch. 
Division of Native Affairs,
Salisbury September, 1960

Some claim that the name Shabanie derives from the isiNdebele Shavani which means "finger 
millet", or "trading together. 
This is very unlikely for the matter that the English pronounced it as Shabanie.

 "va" in ChiShona is pronounced as the isiNdebele "ba".
 The word baba in isiNdebele rhymes with Vava in ChiShona and they are pronounced the same. 
However the isiNdebele syllable va rhymes with vha in ChiShona.

 If Shavani was an isiNdebele word the ChiShona would have pronounced it as Shavhani. The English men would pronounce it as Sharvanie not Shabanie. 
 If Shavani was a ChiShona word the isiNdebele would pronounce it Shabani, and so the English would pronounce it as Shabanie.

For this fact Shabanie derives from the ChiShona word Shavane or Shavani.

All the same finger millet colour is off-reddish, maybe tan in colour. That's Zviyo zvishavani or zvipfunde zvishavani'' (tan corn or tan millet)  in ChiShona. 
Either way, the name derives from tan hills or tan coloured millet.

History

The town developed as a residential centre for Shabani Mine, which started operations in 1916 to supply asbestos during the First World War. Growth was slow due to poor communications until the railway reached the town in 1928. Although the asbestos mine is the biggest producer of the mineral in Zvishavane, platinum, gold, beryl, chromite, iron ore at Buchwa and huge deposits of diamond at Murowa are also mined in the area.

The surrounding area is dominated by cattle ranching, while peasant agriculture is practiced in the nearby communal lands of Mberengwa and Buchwa.

The administration of Zvishavane has developed over the years to keep pace with its growth. A Village Management Board was set up in 1921 and replaced with a Town Management Board in 1930. It was granted municipal status in 1968.

Population

The population of Zvishavane has grown substantially in recent decades due to a boom in mining activity. 
According to the 1982 Population Census, the town had a population of 26,758. By 1992 this had risen to 32,984. The population grew further to 35,128 in 2002 and 45,325 by 2012.

Major Companies 
3 kuhwaura engineering 3
 Mimosa Mining Company
 Shabanie Mine
 Sabi Gold Mine
 Murowa Diamonds
 Pote Holdings
 Midlands State University
 TK engineering

Transports 
The village has a railway station on the Limpopo railway that connects it to Rutenga and Somabhula.

Top Football Teams 
Zvishavane is the home to 2 major football clubs which are:

 FC Platinum
 Shabanie Mine Football Club

https://tk-engineering-mechanical-engineer.business.site/#details==Notable residents==
 Alumni of Shabani Primary School include Philip Matyszak, Judith Todd, and George Zambellas.
 Gift Amuli, musician 
 Mbizvo Chirasha, poet
 Judy Croome, novelist
 Emmerson Mnangagwa, President of Zimbabwe
 Cephas Msipa, governor of Midlands province
 Lewis Matutu, Member of the ZANU-PF central committee, Deputy Secretary for Youth Affairs, Philanthropist, Entrepreneur.
 Elliot Mujaji, Paralympics gold medalist
 Clement Chimuti, Agrobusiness Entrepreneur of the year and renowned golfer, 2015, 2016, 2017
 Tafadzwa Mawarire, Athlete and former African and National motocross champion, Entrepreneur, Mechanical Engineering Technician
 Garfield Todd- founder of Dadaya mission and school, missionary and Prime Minister of Southern Rhodesia
 Judith Todd- author and journalist
Tafadzwa Kuhwaura, Mechanical Engineer and Milwright (https://tk-engineering-mechanical-engineer.business.site/#details)

References

Populated places in Midlands Province
Zvishavane District
Mining communities in Africa
Mining in Zimbabwe